OFA or Ofa may refer to:

Organizations
 Oman Football Association
 Ontario Federation of Agriculture, a farmer lobbying organization
 Ontario Football Alliance
 OpenDocument Format Alliance, a Washington, D.C. lobbying organization
 Organizing for Action, an American political group affiliated with the Democratic Party
 Organizing for America, an American political group affiliated with the Democratic Party
 Orthopedic Foundation for Animals, a non-profit organization for researching diseases of animals

People
 Ofa Faingaʻanuku (born 1982), Tongan rugby union player
 ‘Ofa Likiliki, Tongan women's rights advocate
 Ofa Moce, member of the Fiji women's national basketball team
 Ofa Swann, Fijian lawyer
 Ofa Tu'ungafasi (born 1992), Tongan-New Zealand rugby union player

Places
 Ofa Kugbe (Ofagbe), a town in Nigeria
 Ufa, Bashkortostan, Russia

Other uses
 Cyclone Ofa, a 1990 tropical storm
 Object Free Area, an area on the ground centered on an airport runway or taxiway centerline 
 Ogdensburg Free Academy, a public high school in Ogdensburg, New York
 Optical Fiber Amplifier, a device that amplifies an optical signal directly
 Oracle Fusion Applications, Oracle product
 Oracle Fusion Architecture, Oracle standard
 One For All, a superpower in My Hero Academia